Fleur Faure (born 13 August 1993) is a French professional racing cyclist.

Major results
2014
Fenioux - 80 ans du Vélodrome de Lyon
2nd Scratch Race
2nd Sprint

See also
 List of 2015 UCI Women's Teams and riders

References

External links
 

1993 births
Living people
French female cyclists
Sportspeople from Aix-en-Provence
Cyclists from Provence-Alpes-Côte d'Azur
21st-century French women